Patrick Michael Dean (born May 25, 1989) is an American former professional baseball pitcher. He played in Major League Baseball (MLB) for the Minnesota Twins and in the Korea Baseball Organization for the Kia Tigers.

Amateur career
Dean was born in Waterbury, Connecticut He played at Peter J. Foley Little League Naugatuck, Connecticut and attended Naugatuck High School in Naugatuck, Connecticut, where he was four-year varsity letterman and a Naugatuck Valley All-League first-team and All-State first-team selection three times. In consecutive starts as a senior, he threw a no-hitter and a perfect game. Overall, he was 29–8 with 292 strikeouts in  innings pitched in his high school career.

From 2008 to 2010, Dean attended Boston College. He was 2–1 with a 9.00 ERA in 17 games (one start) his freshman year and 6–4 with a 3.30 earned run average (ERA) in 18 games (15 starts) his sophomore year. As a junior, he went 5–2 with a 4.75 ERA in 12 starts. His 172 career strikeouts are ninth-most in school history.

Professional career

Minnesota Twins
The Minnesota Twins drafted Dean in the third round, 102nd overall, in the 2010 Major League Baseball Draft, a couple selections after catcher Rob Brantly and a couple ahead of catcher J. T. Realmuto. He pitched for the Elizabethton Twins and GCL Twins in 2010, posting a 2–2 record with a 2.15 ERA in 9 games (5 starts). In 29 1/3 innings, he struck out 37 batters. In 2011, Dean was 5–7 with a 5.00 ERA in 20 starts for the Beloit Snappers, Fort Myers Miracle and New Britain Rock Cats. He earned a Player of the Week honor during the week of June 13 while with Beloit. In 2012, he was 10–8 with a 3.99 ERA in 28 starts for Fort Myers. He was a Florida State League Mid-Season All-Star that season. He led league in games started, innings pitched and hits allowed; he also led the team in wins.

Dean split 2013 between the Rock Cats and Rochester Red Wings and went 9–13 with a 4.04 ERA in 28 starts. In his first taste of Triple-A action, he was 3–2 with a 2.02 ERA in 6 starts and earned his second Player of the Week honor during the week of August 12 while with Rochester. He led the Eastern League with a 1.22 walks per nine innings ratio. He was 8–9 with a 4.81 ERA in 26 starts for New Britain in 2014, with opponents batting .320 against him. He began 2015 with Rochester. On April 20, he earned his third Player of the Week honor. The Twins added him to their 40-man roster after the season. He made his MLB debut in 2016.

Kia Tigers
On November 26, 2016, Dean signed a one-year, $900,000 contract with the Kia Tigers of the KBO League. Dean signed a one-year, $925,000 contract with the Tigers on December 1, 2017. In 2017 season, he helped KIA Tigers to win the 2017 Korean Series against Doosan Bears. He became a free agent after the 2018 season.

Second stint with Minnesota Twins
On February 2, 2019, Dean signed a minor league deal with the Minnesota Twins. He was released on March 27, 2019.

Southern Maryland Blue Crabs
On April 18, 2019, Dean signed with the Southern Maryland Blue Crabs of the Atlantic League of Professional Baseball.

Colorado Rockies
On May 6, 2019, Dean's contract was purchased by the Colorado Rockies, and he was assigned to the Triple-A Albuquerque Isotopes. He became a free agent following the 2019 season.

Somerset Patriots
On March 9, 2020, Dean signed with the Somerset Patriots of the Atlantic League of Professional Baseball. He did not play a game for the team because of the cancellation of the ALPB season due to the COVID-19 pandemic and became a free agent after the year.

References

External links

1989 births
Living people
Sportspeople from Waterbury, Connecticut
Baseball players from Connecticut
Major League Baseball pitchers
Minnesota Twins players
Boston College Eagles baseball players
Elizabethton Twins players
Gulf Coast Twins players
Beloit Snappers players
Fort Myers Miracle players
New Britain Rock Cats players
Rochester Red Wings players
Albuquerque Isotopes players
Southern Maryland Blue Crabs players
Gigantes del Cibao players
American expatriate baseball players in the Dominican Republic
Kia Tigers players
KBO League pitchers
American expatriate baseball players in South Korea